David Alan Smith (born 25 June 1961) is an English former professional footballer. His clubs included Gillingham, where he made over 100 Football League appearances, Bristol City, Plymouth Argyle and Notts County.

References

1961 births
Living people
Footballers from Sidcup
English footballers
Association football wingers
Charlton Athletic F.C. players
Welling United F.C. players
Dartford F.C. players
Gillingham F.C. players
Bristol City F.C. players
Plymouth Argyle F.C. players
Notts County F.C. players
English Football League players